Russel Tempel is an American politician. He serves as a Republican member of the Montana Senate, where he represents District 14, including Chester, Montana.

References

Living people
People from Chester, Montana
21st-century American politicians
Republican Party Montana state senators
Year of birth missing (living people)